The Łańcut Synagogue is a Baroque synagogue in Łańcut, Poland. The Łańcut Synagogue is a rare surviving example of the vaulted synagogues with a bimah-tower, that were built throughout the Polish lands in masonry from the sixteenth through the early nineteenth centuries. 

The synagogue was renovated in the mid-20th century, and underwent renovations in the years 1983-1990.

Architecture 
The synagogue is a simple Baroque, masonry building with a vestibule and side room, main hall and a women's balcony above the vestibule reached by an exterior staircase. The windows of the main hall are unusually large for a Polish synagogue; Krinsky believes that this may reflect the security of the Jews in Łańcut, who lived under the protection of the landowning family. The synagogue is built with eight, barrel-vaulted bays around a central Bimah, the four, massive, masonry pillars of which support the ceiling and roof. Painted, decorative plasterwork adorns the pillar capitals, ceiling, and walls. The floor in the restored building is made of concrete. The walls are decorated reproductions of the pre-war paintings. They feature traditional Jewish subjects, such as Noah and the Ark, symbols of the Zodiac, and images of musical instruments mentioned in the Book of Psalms.

Images

References

External links

  Jewish Memorials in Eastern Poland

Former synagogues in Poland
Jewish museums in Poland
Religious buildings and structures completed in 1761
Baroque synagogues in Poland
18th-century synagogues
Synagogues preserved as museums
Łańcut County
Buildings and structures in Podkarpackie Voivodeship
Museums in Podkarpackie Voivodeship